The following is a list of Scottish Rugby Union footballers killed in World War I.

 Cecil Halliday Abercrombie, died on 31 May 1916 aged 30
 David McLaren Bain, died on 3 June 1915, aged 24
 David Bedell-Sivright ("Darkie Bedell-Sivright"), died on 5 September 1915, aged 35
 Patrick Charles Bentley Blair, died on 6 July 1915 aged 24.
 John Argentine Campbell, died on 1 December 1917, aged 40.
 William Campbell Church, died on 28 June 1915, aged 32.
 Walter Michael Dickson, died on 26 September 1915, aged 30.
 John Henry Dods, died on 31 December 1915, aged 40
 Walter Torrie Forrest, died on 19 April 1917, aged 36
 Rowland Fraser, died on 1 July 1916, aged 26.
 William Elphinstone Gordon, died on 30 August 1918, aged 25
 James Young Milne Henderson, died on 31 July 1917, aged 26
 David Dickie Howie ("Dave Howie"), died on 19 January 1916, aged 27
 James Laidlaw Huggan, died on 16 September 1914, aged 25
 William Ramsay Hutchison, died on 22 March 1918, aged 29
 George A.W. Lamond, died on 25 February 1918, aged 39
 Eric Milroy, ("Puss Milroy") died on 18 July 1916 aged 28. 
 Thomas Arthur Nelson, died on 9 April 1917, aged 40
 James Pearson, died on 22 May 1915, aged 26
 Lewis Robertson, died on 3 November 1914, aged 31
 James Ross, died on 31 October 1914, aged 34
 Andrew Ross, died on 6 April 1916, aged 36
 Ronald Francis Simson, died on 14 September 1914, aged 24
 Stephen Sebastian Leonard Steyn, died on 8 December 1917, aged 28
 Walter Riddell Sutherland ("Wattie Suddie"), died on 4 October 1918, aged 27
 Frederick Harding Turner, died on 10 January 1915, aged 26
 Albert Luvian Wade, died on 28 April 1917, aged 32.
 William Middleton Wallace, died on 22 August 1915, aged 22
 John George Will, died on 25 March 1917, aged 24
 John Skinner Wilson, died on 31 May 1916, aged 32
 Eric Templeton Young, died on 28 June 1915, aged 23

See also 
 List of international rugby union players killed in action during the First World War
 List of Wales rugby union footballers killed in the World Wars
 List of Scottish rugby union players killed in World War II

References 

 

Lists of Scotland national rugby union players
 
Scotland